Jacob Isaacs (9 October 1799 – 24 May 1870) was a Jamaican-born Jewish slave-owner who became a successful West Indies merchant in London.

Early life and family

Jacob Isaacs was born in Jamaica on 9 October 1799, the son of Solomon Isaacs. He was Jewish.

He married Eliza, also born in Jamaica, and they had children Sarah G. (1835–), Agnes (1836–1889), Georgina (1838–), Eliza (1841–), Albert Henry (c. 1841–), Augusta Mary (1843), Lydia (1846–), Edith Annie (1847–1925), Ellen Octavia (1849–), and Mabel I. (1852–). The four oldest were born in Jamaica and the younger children in London.

Career
Isaacs was registered as a slave-owner in St Elizabeth, Jamaica, in 1832. In 1836 he received compensation for freed slaves in the amounts of £110 and £29.

By the time of the 1851 British census he was living at 5 Dorset Square, Marylebone, London, and trading as a merchant. He was able to employ governess, a nurse, a nursemaid and four servants. He was still there at the time of the 1861 census when he was described as a "Merchant West Indian". His son Albert was working in his father's business in 1861 and Isaacs was able to afford to employ a nurse, an invalid attendant and six servants.

He had premises at 7 Jeffreys Square in the City of London, a square off St Mary Axe that no longer exists.

Death and legacy
Isaacs died on 24 May 1870 at 1a Cavendish Road, St John's Wood, Middlesex, leaving an estate not exceeding £30,000. He was survived by his wife Eliza.

References 

1799 births
1870 deaths
19th-century British businesspeople
Slavery in Jamaica
British slave owners
Migrants from British Jamaica to the United Kingdom
Jamaican Jews
19th-century Jamaican people